Nathan Coulter (born March 9, 1986) is an American politician serving in the Minnesota House of Representatives since 2023. A member of the Minnesota Democratic-Farmer-Labor-Party (DFL), Coulter represents District 51B in the southwestern Twin Cities metropolitan area, which includes the city of Bloomington and parts of Hennepin County in Minnesota.

Early life, education and career 
Coulter grew up in Bloomington, Minnesota, and received his bachelor's degree in political science, and music from St. Olaf College. He earned an M.P.A. in health, housing, education policy and leadership from the Humphrey School of Public Affairs.

Coulter worked as a legislative assistant and DFL researcher at the Minnesota Senate for ten years. He has served on the Board of Directors of the Perpich Center for Arts Education and twice as the Bloomington Housing and Redevelopment Authority Commissioner-from 2015 to 2019 and from 2022 to 2023. Coulter served on the Bloomington City Council from 2018 until he was elected to the legislature.

Minnesota House of Representatives 
Coulter was first elected to the Minnesota House of Representatives in 2022, after redistricting created a new Bloomington-based district. Coulter serves on the Children and Families Finance and Policy, Elections Finance and Policy, Higher Education Finance and Policy, and Veterans and Military Affairs Finance and Policy Committees and the Property Tax Division of the Taxes Committee.

Electoral history

Personal life 
Coulter lives in Bloomington, Minnesota, with his spouse, Charity, and has two children.

References

External links 

Living people
1986 births
21st-century American politicians
Democratic Party members of the Minnesota House of Representatives
St. Olaf College alumni
Humphrey School of Public Affairs alumni
People from Bloomington, Minnesota